This is a list of mergers of universities and/or colleges in the United States with the name of the surviving institution, predecessors, and effective date.

A through D
Alderson Broaddus University – merger of Alderson Academy and Broaddus Institute, 1932
Alliant International University – merger of California School of Professional Psychology and United States International University, 2001
American Sentinel University – merger of American College of Computer & Information Sciences and American Graduate School of Management
Argosy University – merger of American Schools of Professional Psychology, the University of Sarasota and the Medical Institute of Minnesota, 2001
University of Arizona – acquired Ashford University, 2021 
University of Arkansas – acquired Grantham University
Azusa Pacific College – absorbed Arlington College, 1968
Azusa Pacific College – merger of Azusa College and Los Angeles Pacific College, 1965
Aurora University – absorbed George Williams College (Chicago), 2000
University of Baltimore – absorbed Eastern College, 1970
Benedictine College – merger of Mount Saint Scholastica College and St. Benedict's College – 1971
Big Sandy Community and Technical College – merger of Prestonsburg Community College and Mayo Technical College.
Birmingham–Southern College – merger of Southern University (Alabama) and Birmingham College in 1918.
Boston University School of Medicine – absorbed Boston Female Medical School, 1874
Boston College absorbed Pine Manor College, 2020
Boston University – merger of Boston University School of Education and Wheelock College of Education and Human Development, 2017
Brevard College – merger of Brevard Institute, Weaverville College, and Rutherford College, 1934
Brown University – merged with Pembroke College, 1971
University of California, Berkeley – merger of the College of California and the Agricultural, Mining, and Mechanical Arts College, 1853
Carnegie Mellon University – formed by the merger of Carnegie Institute of Technology and the Mellon Institute of Industrial Research
Carson-Newman University – merger of Carson College and Newman College for Women, 1889
Case Western Reserve University – merger of Case Tech and Western Reserve, 1967
The Catholic University of America – absorbed Columbus University, 1954
Central Nazarene College – absorbed Nazarene Bible Institute (1911)
Chicago College of Performing Arts – absorbed Roosevelt University School of Music, 1954
University of Cincinnati – absorbed Medical College of Ohio 1896; Cincinnati Law School, absorbed 1896; Cincinnati College of Pharmacy, 1954; Cincinnati College-Conservatory of Music, absorbed in 1962.
Cincinnati College-Conservatory of Music – formed by merger of Cincinnati Conservatory of Music and the College of Music of Cincinnati in 1955.
Cincinnati Law School absorbed Cincinnati College in the late 1830s.
Clark Atlanta University – merger of Clark College and Atlanta University, 1988
Cleveland State University – absorbed Cleveland-Marshall College of Law in 1969
Cornell University – absorbed New York Hospital Training School for Nurses, 1942
Daniel Webster College – acquired by ITT Educational Services Inc. in 2009
Davenport University – merger of Davenport College, Detroit College of Business, and Great Lakes College, 2000.
University of Delaware – merger of Newark College and Women's College of Delaware, 1921
Delaware State University acquired Wesley College, 2021 
University of Denver – absorbed Colorado Women's College, 1982
DePaul University – absorbed Barat College, 2001
University of Detroit Mercy – merger of University of Detroit and Mercy College, 1990
Dillard University – merger of Straight University and New Orleans University, 1934

E through K
Emerson College – absorbed Marlboro College, 2020
Erskine College – absorbed Due West Female College, 1927
Fordham University – absorbed Marymount College, 2002
Gannon University – absorbed Villa Marie College, 1989
The George Washington University – absorbed Mount Vernon College for Women, 1999; absorbed Benjamin Franklin University, 1987; absorbed National University, 1954
Georgia Health Sciences University (formerly the Medical College of Georgia) merged with Augusta State University, 2012, to form Georgia Regents University (later renamed Augusta University)
Georgia Southern University – absorbed Armstrong State University, 2018
Gordon College (Massachusetts) – absorbed Barrington College (1985)
Hamilton College – absorbed Kirkland College, 1978
Hannibal-LaGrange College (now Hannibal-LaGrange University) – merger of LaGrange College and Hannibal College, 1928
Harvard University – signed merger with Radcliffe College in 1977; completed merger in 1999
University of Hartford – merger of Hartford Art School, Hartt College of Music, and Hillyer College, 1957
Hendrix College – absorbed Henderson-Brown College, 1929; absorbed Galloway Women's College, 1933
Hope International University – merged with Nebraska Christian College, 2016
University of Houston–Downtown – assets were acquired from South Texas Junior College, 1974
Houghton College – absorbed United Wesleyan College, 1989
University of Illinois at Chicago – absorbed the John Marshall Law School, 2019
Illinois Institute of Technology – merger of Armour Institute of Technology and Lewis Institute, 1940; absorbed Institute of Design, 1949; absorbed Chicago-Kent College of Law, 1969; absorbed Midwest College of Engineering, 1986
Indiana University Purdue University Indianapolis – merger of Indiana University School of Medicine, Indiana University Robert H. McKinney School of Law, Indiana University School of Dentistry, Indiana University Herron School of Art, Indiana University Indianapolis Extension, and Purdue University Indianapolis Extension, 1969
Johnson University – absorbed Florida Christian College, 2013
Kansas State University – absorbed Kansas College of Technology, 1991

L through M
University of Kentucky – absorbed the Louisville College of Pharmacy in 1947.
University of La Verne – absorbed San Fernando Valley College of Law, 1983
Lawson State Community College – absorbed Bessemer State Technical College, 2005.
LeMoyne-Owen College -merger of LeMoyne College and S. A. Owen Junior College in 1968
Luther College – absorbed Decorah College for Women, 1936
Long Island University – absorbed Brooklyn College of Pharmacy, 1976
Loyola University Chicago – absorbed Mundelein College, Chicago, 1991
Loyola Marymount University – merger of Marymount College and Loyola University, 1973
Loyola University Maryland – absorbed Mount Saint Agnes College, 1971
Loyola University New Orleans – absorbed College of the Immaculate Conception, 1911; absorbed New Orleans College of Pharmacy, 1919
 Macon State College and Middle Georgia College merger to form Middle Georgia State College, 2013 (now Middle Georgia State University)
Mannes College of Music – absorbed Chatham Square Music School
Martin Luther College – merger of Dr. Martin Luther College and Northwestern College (Wisconsin), 1995
University of Maryland, Baltimore – absorbed Baltimore College, 1830
University of Massachusetts Boston – absorbed Boston State College, 1982
University of Massachusetts Dartmouth – merger of Bradford Durfee College of Technology and New Bedford Institute of Technology, 1964; absorbed Southern New England School of Law, 2010
University of Massachusetts Lowell – merger of Lowell State College and Lowell Technological Institute, 1975–76
University of Memphis – acquired Lambuth University campus, 2011
Mercer University – absorbed Tift College, 1986
Miami University – absorbed Oxford College of Music and Art, 1928; absorbed Western College, 1974
Middlebury College – affiliated then acquired the Monterey Institute of International Studies (MIIS), now a graduate school, 2010
Millsaps College – absorbed Grenada College, 1936; absorbed Whitworth College, 1938
Morningside College – absorbed Charles City College, 1914

N through R
National College – acquired Kentucky College of Business and absorbed Fugazzi College.
National Louis University – acquired the assets of Kendall College, 2018
University of Nevada, Reno merged with Sierra Nevada University, 2022
University of New England – merged with Westbrook College, 1996.
The New School (then the New School for Social Research) – absorbed Parsons School of Design in 1970; absorbed Mannes College of Music in 1989.
New York University – acquired Bellevue Hospital Medical College in 1898; acquired New York College of Dentistry in 1925; acquired Polytechnic University in 2008, merged in 2014
Northeastern University – absorbed Bouve College in 1964
Northeastern University – acquired Mills College in 2022
North Central College acquired Shimer College, June 1, 2017 
 North Georgia College & State University and Gainesville State College merge, to form the University of North Georgia, 2012 
Nova Southeastern University – merger of Nova University and Southeastern University of the Health Sciences, 1994
Pace University – absorbed Briarcliff College, 1977; merged with College of White Plains (formerly Good Counsel College), 1975
Pennsylvania State University – absorbed Dickinson School of Law, 2000
Phillips Community College of the University of Arkansas – absorbed the Rice Belt Technical Institute, 1996
Piedmont International University – absorbed Tennessee Temple University in 2015, Southeastern Bible College (Birmingham, Alabama) in 2017, and John Wesley University in 2018
Polytechnic University – absorbed NYU School of Engineering and Science, 1973
University of Portland – absorbed Multnomah College, 1969
Purdue University – acquired Kaplan University, 2017
Purdue University Northwest – consolidation of Purdue Calumet and Purdue North Central, 2016
Regis University – absorbed Loretto Heights College, 1988
Rich Mountain Community College – formed by the merger of Rich Mountain Vocational-Technical School and the off-campus program of Henderson State University, 1983
Roosevelt University – acquired Robert Morris University Illinois campuses, 2020
Rutgers University – absorbed University of Newark, 1947

S through Z
College of St. Catherine – absorbed St. Mary's Junior College, 1986
Saint Joseph's merger with University of the Sciences, 2021
University of San Diego – absorbed San Diego College for Women, 1972
Shimer College acquired by North Central College, June 1, 2017 
South Arkansas Community College – merger of Southern Arkansas University, El Dorado Branch and Oil Belt Technical College, 1992
Southern Benedictine College – merger of Saint's Bernard College and Cullman College, 1976
Southern Nazarene University – absorbed Peniel College (1920), Central Nazarene College (1929), Arkansas Holiness College (1931), Bresee Theological College (1940)
Southern New Hampshire University absorbed Notre Dame College, 2002; absorbed Daniel Webster College, 2017
St. John's University (New York City) College of Business – absorbed the College of Insurance – 2001
 South Georgia College and Waycross College merger to form South Georgia State College, 2012  
Southwestern University – merger of Rutersville College, Wesleyan College, McKenzie College, and Soule University, 1873
College of Staten Island – merger of Staten Island Community College (SICC) and Richmond College, 1976
University of Tennessee at Chattanooga – merger of the University of Chattanooga, University of Tennessee, and Chattanooga City College, 1969
Tennessee State University – absorbed University of Tennessee at Nashville, 1979
The University of Texas Rio Grande Valley – consolidation of The University of Texas–Pan American and The University of Texas at Brownsville, 2015
Thomas Jefferson University – merged with Philadelphia University, 2017
University of Toledo – merger with Medical University of Ohio, 2006
Transylvania University
Merged with Kentucky University, 1865, adopting the latter school's name (Transylvania name restored in 1908)
Absorbed Hamilton College (Kentucky), 1903
Trenholm State Technical College – Formed by a merger between H. Councill Treholm State Technical College and John M. Patterson State Technical College, 2002/2003.
Trinity University (Texas) – absorbed University of San Antonio, 1942
Union College (Kentucky) – absorbed Sue Bennett College, 1997
Union Theological Seminary (New York) – absorbed Episcopal Divinity School, 2017
Vanderbilt University – absorbed Peabody College, 1979
Virginia Commonwealth University – merger of Richmond Professional Institute and Medical College of Virginia
Virginia Tech – absorbed Virginia Tech Carilion School of Medicine and Research Institute, 2018.
Virginia Union University – absorbed Hartshorn Memorial College, 1932
Washington & Jefferson College – merger of Washington College in Washington, Pennsylvania and Jefferson College in Canonsburg, Pennsylvania, 1865
Wayne State University (then Wayne University) – formed by the merger of Detroit City College, Detroit Teachers College and Detroit Medical College
University of West Los Angeles – absorbed the San Fernando Valley College of Law in 2002
Willamette University – absorbed Pacific Northwest College of Art in 2021
Xavier University (Cincinnati) – absorbed Edgecliff College in 1980

See also
 List of American institutions of higher education
 List of colloquial names for universities and colleges in the United States
 List of university and college name changes in the United States
 List of university and college nickname changes in the United States

References

Mergers
 
Embedded educational institutions